Stage Door Records is a UK-based label founded in 2007 by Tim Hutton that specializes in cast recordings and vocalist albums from stars of stage and screen. The label has issued a number of cast albums on CD for the first time, including Mutiny! (original London cast with David Essex) and Colette (original London cast with Cleo Laine). Other cast albums include Napoleon, The Far Pavilions, Out of the Blue and Beautiful and Damned.

Stage Door has also released vocalist albums by Twiggy, Anthony Newley, Shirley Jones and Steve Barton.

Throughout 2011, Stage Door recorded West End leading lady Meredith Braun's debut solo album Someone Else's Story released in March 2012.

Stage Door is distributed in the United Kingdom through Proper Note.

List of releases

STAGE 9000: Shirley Bassey - The Early Years
STAGE 9001: Wish You Were Here (Original Broadway Cast Recording)
STAGE 9002: On Your Toes / Pal Joey (Studio Cast Recordings)
STAGE 9003: New Faces Of 1956 / Mrs. Patterson (Original Broadway Cast Recording)
STAGE 9004: Ruggles Of Red Gap (Original Television Cast)
STAGE 9005: Gloria Swanson in Boulevard! (Concept Cast Recording)
STAGE 9006: Selections From Cole Porter's Anything Goes
STAGE 9007: Dee Shipman - She Isn't Me
STAGE 9008: Shirley Jones - Then & Now
STAGE 9009: Living For Pleasure (Original London Cast)
STAGE 9010: Hermione Gingold - Live At The Cafe De Paris
STAGE 9011: Lillian Roth - I'll Cry Tomorrow
STAGE 9012: Julie Andrews - Musicality
STAGE 9013: Gigi (Studio Cast Recordings)
STAGE 9014: Charles Aznavour - Believe In Me
STAGE 9015: Napoleon (Original Toronto Cast Recording)
STAGE 9016: Spotlight On Larry Kert
STAGE 9017: Steve Barton - Only For A While
STAGE 9018: Twiggy - Gotta Sing, Gotta Dance
STAGE 9019: The Far Pavilions (Concept Cast Recording)
STAGE 9020: Once Upon A Time (Studio Cast Recording)
STAGE 9021: Colette (Original London Cast Recording)
STAGE 9022: Anthony Newley - Newley Discovered
STAGE 9023: Steve Barton - Encore
STAGE 9024: Beautiful And Damned (Concept Cast Recording)
STAGE 9025: Out Of The Blue (Original London Cast Recording)
STAGE 9026: Mutiny! (Original London Cast Recording)
STAGE 9027: J'Accuse...! - The Passions Of Émile Zola (Original Concept Recording)
STAGE 9028: The Sound Of Music (Original Australian Cast Recording)
STAGE 9029: Meredith Braun - Someone Else's Story
STAGE 9030: Dave Willetts - Once In A Lifetime: The 25th Anniversary Collection
STAGE 9031: Anthony Newley - The Last Song: The Final Recordings
STAGE 9032: Chita Rivera - Chita! / And Now I Sing!
STAGE 9033: Privates On Parade (Original London Cast Recording)
STAGE 9034: Andy Capp (Original London Cast Recording)
STAGE 9048: Drake's Dream (Original London Cast Recording)

References

External links
 



British record labels
Musical theatre record labels
2007 establishments in the United Kingdom
British companies established in 2007